Emanuelis Zingeris (born 16 July 1957 in Kaunas, Lithuania) is a Lithuanian philologist, museum director, politician, signatory of the 1990 Act of the Re-Establishment of the State of Lithuania, currently serving as a Member of the Seimas (1990–2000 and since 2004), chairman of its foreign affairs committee (since 2010), Vice President of the Parliamentary Assembly of the Council of Europe (since 2009) and President of the Parliamentary Forum of the Community of Democracies (since 2010). A Lithuanian Jew, he has been director of the Vilna Gaon Jewish State Museum, honorary chairman of Lithuania's Jewish community, and is Chairman of the International Commission for the Evaluation of the Crimes of the Nazi and Soviet Occupation Regimes in Lithuania. He is a founding signatory of the Prague Declaration on European Conscience and Communism, that proposed the establishment of the European Day of Remembrance for Victims of Stalinism and Nazism.

Early life and education
Zingeris graduated from Vilnius University in 1981 with a degree in philology. Himself being Jewish, he wrote his post-graduate dissertation on the Jewish cultural heritage of Lithuania, a difficult subject at the time.

Political career
Zingeris was a member of the pro-independence Sąjūdis movement and was elected to the Seimas (parliament) in 1990, where he served as chair of both the foreign affairs committee and the human rights committee, and as a member of several interparliamentary relations groups.

Zingeris failed to be reelected in 2000, and served as director of the Vilna Gaon Jewish State Museum, which he helped found, from 2000 to 2004. In 2004, he returned to parliament. Having formerly been a member of the Social Democratic Party, he is now representing the Homeland Union – Lithuanian Christian Democrats and the European People's Party at the European level.

He was honorary chairman of the Lithuanian Jewish Community, but resigned from this position in 1997 after he was elected chairman of the Lithuanian Parliamentary Committee on Human and Civic Rights and National Minorities, stating that he was "thus bound to have concern for all national minorities". In 1998, he was appointed chairman of the International Commission for the Evaluation of the Crimes of the Nazi and Soviet Occupation Regimes in Lithuania by President Valdas Adamkus.

In addition to his role in parliament, Zingeris has chaired the Lithuanian delegation to the Parliamentary Assembly of the Council of Europe (PACE) in 2009 and is one of the Vice Presidents of PACE. In this capacity, he has been serving as the Assembly's rapporteur on the case of Boris Nemtsov since 2020.

Zingeris has also chaired both the Lithuanian and Israeli inter-parliamentary group, and the Lithuanian and American inter-parliamentary group. In 2010, he was also elected President of the Parliamentary Forum of the Community of Democracies.

He is a founding signatory of the Prague Declaration on European Conscience and Communism.

Recognitions
Order of the Lithuanian Grand Duke Gediminas
Order of Merit of the Federal Republic of Germany
Order of Merit of the Republic of Poland
Order of Merit of Ukraine

Family

Zingeris is married and has a son and a daughter. His brother Markas Zingeris is the director of the Jewish Museum in Vilnius and the adviser on genocide to the Prime Minister. Emanuelis Zingeris speaks Lithuanian, Yiddish, Polish, German, English and Russian.

References

1957 births
Living people
Writers from Kaunas
Members of the Seimas
Vilnius University alumni
Lithuanian Jews
Recipients of the Cross of the Order of Merit of the Federal Republic of Germany
Recipients of the Order of the Lithuanian Grand Duke Gediminas
Recipients of the Order of Merit of the Republic of Poland
Directors of museums in Lithuania
21st-century Lithuanian politicians
Politicians from Kaunas